Camille Ligon (born July 21, 1986), known by her ring name Holidead, is an American professional wrestler. She is currently signed to Major League Wrestling (MLW).

Professional wrestling career

Ring of Honor Wrestling (ROH) (2017–2022) 
In 2017 Holidead debuted in Ring of Honor Wrestling (ROH) in a One-on-one match against Sumie Sakai but was unsuccessful. Afterwards Holidead entered the Women of Honor Championship tournament in 2018 but lost to Deonna Purrazzo in the first round via submission.

In 2021 Holiday returned to Ring of Honor but this time it was to enter the ROH Women's World Championship tournament after the ROH Women of Honor title had been retired due to then Kelly Klein's contract dispute with the ROH owner. Holidead returned in the ROH Women's World Title tournament against Max The Impaler but was unsuccessful as Max The Impaler defeated her in the One-on-one female powerhouse match-up via pinfall.

Afterwards Holidead had a couple of good ROH Women's matches in ROH even facing Rok-C in a One-on-one match for the ROH Women's World Championship (Which Holidead was not successful at winning) but later disappeared from Ring of Honor.

Major League Wrestling (2021–present)
On the September 22, 2021, episode of Fusion: Alpha, MLW officially announced the launch of its women's featherweight division and Holidead was introduced as one of the first female wrestlers on the roster. On April 21, 2022, MLW announced that the MLW Women's Featherweight Championship would be decided at Kings of Colosseum, when dominant force Holidead faces the returning Taya Valkyrie. At the event, Valkyrie won the title.

Championships and accomplishments
 Crossfire Wrestling
 CW Women's Championship (1 time)
 Mission Pro Wrestling
 MPW Championship (1 time, current)
 Pro Wrestling Illustrated
 Ranked No. 82 of the top 150 female wrestlers in the PWI Women's 150 in 2021
 Renegade Wrestling Alliance
 RWA Women's Championship (2 times)
 Resistance Pro Wrestling
 Resistance Women's Championship (1 time)
 Shine Wrestling
 Shine Tag Team Championship (1 time) – with Thunder Rosa
 Vendetta Pro Wrestling
 Vendetta Pro/NWA International Tag Team Championship (1 time) – with Thunder Rosa

References

External links 
 

1986 births
Living people
Sportspeople from Cleveland
American female professional wrestlers
African-American female professional wrestlers
Professional wrestlers from Ohio
21st-century African-American sportspeople
Expatriate professional wrestlers in Japan
21st-century professional wrestlers